Pirallahı or Pirallahi may refer to:
 Pirallahi Island, Azerbaijan, in the Caspian Sea
 Pirallahı, Baku, a village in Baku, Azerbaijan

See also
 Pirallahy raion, a municipal district of Baku, Azerbaijan
 Boyuk Zira
 Vulf
 Qum Island
 Tava Island